Canterbury's Esk River is a tributary of the Waimakariri River.

Brown and rainbow trout are available in the river, but fishing is restricted.

Its tributaries include the Pūkio Stream, which prior to the Pleistocene epoch acted as an outlet for the Cox River into the Esk.

See also
Esk River (Hawke's Bay)
List of rivers of New Zealand

References

Land Information New Zealand - Search for Place Names

Hurunui District
Rivers of Canterbury, New Zealand
Rivers of New Zealand